Health care or healthcare is the diagnosis, treatment, and prevention of disease, illness, and injury.

Health care may also refer to:
 Health care system, an organization of institutions
 Health care industry, a sector of the economy
 "Health Care" (The Office), an episode of The Office

See also
 Health, the general condition of a person's mind, body and spirit
 Health systems by country
 :Category:Health care by country